The 2010 Grey Power Players' Championship was the last Grand Slam event of both the World Curling Tour and Women's World Curling Tour for the 2009-10 season. This was the eighteenth time the event took place, and the fifth time since it was switched to joint men's/women's format. The event was held at the EnCana Events Centre in Dawson Creek, British Columbia April 13–18. It was the first Players' Championship since 2006 to feature international teams, as Canadian Olympic qualifying points were not on the line. The total purse for each event was $100,000.

Many of the top teams declined participation, due strain of the Olympic season. Only one international team participated, that being Sweden's Niklas Edin. Russia's Liudmila Privivkova was set to play in the women's event, but was unable to secure a travel visa.

Men's event

Teams

Results

A event

B event

C Event

Playoffs

Women's event

Teams

Results

A event

B event

C Event

Playoffs

Notes

References

Players Championships, 2010
Dawson Creek
Curling in British Columbia
Players' Championship